The St. Louis Cardinals' 1982 season was the team's 101st season in St. Louis, Missouri and the 91st season in the National League. Making up for the previous season's near-miss, the Cardinals went 92—70 during the season and won their first-ever National League East Division title by three games over the Philadelphia Phillies. They achieved their first postseason appearance since 1968 and defeated the National League West champion Atlanta Braves in three straight games to claim the NL pennant. From there, they went on to win the World Series in seven games over the American League champion Milwaukee Brewers. It was the Cardinals' first World Championship since 1967, and their last until they opened the current Busch Stadium in 2006.

Offseason 
 October 21, 1981: Bob Sykes was traded by the Cardinals to the New York Yankees for Willie McGee.
 October 23, 1981: Jeff Little was traded by the Cardinals to the Minnesota Twins for Mike Kinnunen.
 November 20, 1981: Silvio Martínez and Lary Sorensen were traded by the Cardinals to the Cleveland Indians as part of a three-team trade. The Philadelphia Phillies traded Lonnie Smith to the Cardinals. The Indians traded Bo Díaz to the Phillies. The Phillies sent a player to be named later to the Indians. The Phillies completed the deal by sending Scott Munninghoff to the Indians on December 9.
 December 10, 1981: Sixto Lezcano, Garry Templeton and a player to be named later were traded by the Cardinals to the San Diego Padres for Ozzie Smith, Steve Mura and a player to be named later. The deal was completed on February 19, 1982, with the Padres sending Al Olmsted to the Cardinals and the Cardinals sending Luis DeLeón to the Padres.
 December 29, 1981: Joaquín Andújar was signed as a free agent by the Cardinals.

Regular season 

First baseman Keith Hernandez and shortstop Ozzie Smith won Gold Gloves this year.

Season standings

Record vs. opponents

Opening Day lineup 
Lonnie Smith, CF
Tom Herr, 2B
Keith Hernandez, 1B
Darrell Porter, C
George Hendrick, RF
Dane Iorg, LF
Steve Braun, 3B
Ozzie Smith, SS
Bob Forsch, P

Notable games 
 May 30, 1982: The Cardinals rally twice in their last at-bat in a thrilling 6—5 victory over the San Diego Padres at Busch Memorial Stadium. St. Louis trailed 3-0 entering the bottom of the ninth when Keith Hernandez led off with a single to left field. Hernandez took second on a single by George Hendrick and scored on Lonnie Smith's RBI double. After a Mike Ramsey ground out, Julio González reached on Padre third baseman Luis Salazar's error, allowing Hendrick to score and cutting the deficit to 3—2, and two batters later, Smith scored on Tom Herr's sacrifice fly to tie the game. After San Diego tacked on an additional two runs off Bruce Sutter in the top of the tenth inning, the Cardinals rallied again in the bottom half. Padres reliever Gary Lucas retired Orlando Sánchez and Hernandez to start the inning, but allowed a two-out single to Hendrick. Lonnie Smith then doubled Hendrick home to bring St. Louis back within 5—4, and Ramsey's subsequent RBI single tied the game. After Julio Gonzalez was hit by a pitch, Dane Iorg lined a single into center field, scoring Ramsey with the winning run.

Notable transactions 
 June 7, 1982: 1982 Major League Baseball draft
Terry Pendleton was drafted by the Cardinals in the 7th round. Player signed June 12, 1982.
Vince Coleman was drafted by the Cardinals in the 10th round. Player signed June 9, 1982.
 June 25, 1982: Joe Boever was signed by the Cardinals as an amateur free agent.
 August 11, 1982: Eric Rasmussen was purchased by the Cardinals from the Leones de Yucatán.

Roster

Game log 

|- style="background:#ccffcc;"
| 10 || April 16 || Phillies || 3–2 || || || || 7–3 || W6
|- style="background:#ccffcc;"
| 11 || April 17 || Phillies || 6–0 || || || || 8–3 || W7
|- style="background:#ccffcc;"
| 12 || April 18 || Phillies || 6–5  || || || || 9–3 || W8
|- style="background:#ccffcc;"
| 15 || April 23 || @ Phillies || 9–2 || || || || 12–3 || W11
|- style="background:#ccffcc;"
| 16 || April 24 || @ Phillies || 7–4 || || || || 13–3 || W12
|- style="background:#ffbbbb;"
| 17 || April 25 || @ Phillies || 4–8 || || || || 13–4 || L1
|-

|- style="background:#ffbbbb;"
| 28 || May 7 || Braves || 3–6  || || || || 18–10 || L1
|- style="background:#ccffcc;"
| 29 || May 8 || Braves || 8–7 || || || || 19–10 || W1
|- style="background:#ffbbbb;"
| 30 || May 9 || Braves || 0–3 || || || || 19–11 || L1
|- style="background:#ccffcc;"
| 33 || May 13 || @ Braves || 10–9 || || || || 21–12 || W2
|- style="background:#ffbbbb;"
| 34 || May 14 || @ Braves || 1–2 || || || || 21–13 || L1
|- style="background:#ccffcc;"
| 35 || May 15 || @ Braves || 7–6  || || || || 22–13 || W1
|- style="background:#ffbbbb;"
| 36 || May 16 || @ Braves || 2–5 || || || || 22–14 || L1
|- style="background:#ccffcc;"
| 40 || May 21 || @ Dodgers || 6–3 || || || || 25–15 || W2
|- style="background:#ffbbbb;"
| 41 || May 22 || @ Dodgers || 2–3 || || || || 25–16 || L1
|- style="background:#ffbbbb;"
| 42 || May 23 || @ Dodgers || 0–5 || || || || 25–17 || L2
|- style="background:#ccffcc;"
| 43 || May 24 || @ Giants || 6–0 || || || || 26–17 || W1
|- style="background:#ccffcc;"
| 44 || May 25 || @ Giants || 8–3 || || || || 27–17 || W2
|- style="background:#ccffcc;"
| 45 || May 26 || @ Giants || 8–4 || || || || 28–17 || W3
|- style="background:#ccffcc;"
| 49 || May 31 || Giants || 11–6 || || || || 31–18 || W2
|-

|- style="background:#ffbbbb;"
| 50 || June 1 || Giants || 3–4  || || || || 31–19 || L1
|- style="background:#ccffcc;"
| 51 || June 2 || Giants || 1–0 || || || || 32–19 || W1
|- style="background:#ccffcc;"
| 52 || June 4 || Dodgers || 5–2 || || || || 33–19 || W2
|- style="background:#ffbbbb;"
| 53 || June 5 || Dodgers || 2–6 || || || || 33–20 || L1
|- style="background:#ffbbbb;"
| 54 || June 6 || Dodgers || 3–5 || || || || 33–21 || L2
|- style="background:#ffbbbb;"
| 55 || June 7 || @ Expos || 2–3 || || || || 33–22 || L3
|- style="background:#ccffcc;"
| 56 || June 8 || @ Expos || 5–4  || || || || 34–22 || W1
|- style="background:#ffbbbb;"
| 57 || June 9 || @ Expos || 5–1 || || || || 34–23 || L1
|- style="background:#ccffcc;"
| 60 || June 14 || Expos || 2–1 || || || || 36–24 || W1
|- style="background:#ccffcc;"
| 61 || June 15 || Expos || 3–2  || || || || 37–24 || W2
|- style="background:#ffbbbb;"
| 62 || June 16 || Expos || 3–8 || || || || 37–25 || L1
|- style="background:#ccffcc;"
| 67 || June 21 || Phillies || 7–5 || || || || 39–28 || W1
|- style="background:#ccffcc;"
| 68 || June 22 || Phillies || 3–2 || || || || 40–28 || W2
|- style="background:#ffbbbb;"
| 69 || June 23 || Phillies || 1–7 || || || || 40–29 || L1
|- style="background:#ffbbbb;"
| 70 || June 24 || Phillies || 2–10 || || || || 40–30 || L2
|- style="background:#ffbbbb;"
| 75 || June 28 || @ Phillies || 0–1 || || || || 42–33 || L2
|- style="background:#ccffcc;"
| 76 || June 29 || @ Phillies || 15–3 || || || || 43–33 || W1
|- style="background:#ffbbbb;"
| 77 || June 30 || @ Phillies || 3–6 || || || || 43–34 || L1
|-

|- style="background:#ffbbbb;"
| 83 || July 7 || @ Braves || 2–3 || || || || 46–37 || L1
|- style="background:#ccffcc;"
| 84 || July 8 || @ Braves || 5–2 || || || || 47–37 || W1
|- style="background:#ffbbbb;"
| 92 || July 19 || Braves || 1–4 || || || || 51–41 || L1
|- style="background:#ffbbbb;"
| 93 || July 20 || Braves || 6–8 || || || || 51–42 || L2
|- style="background:#ccffcc;"
| 94 || July 21 || Braves || 8–0 || || || || 52–42 || W1
|- style="background:#ffbbbb;"
| 100 || July 29 || @ Expos || 3–4  || || || || 57–43 || L1
|- style="background:#ffbbbb;"
| 101 || July 30 || @ Expos || 4–5  || || || || 57–44 || L2
|- style="background:#ccffcc;"
| 102 || July 31 || @ Expos || 10–1 || || || || 58–44 || W1
|-

|- style="background:#ffbbbb;"
| 103 || August 1 || @ Expos || 4–5 || || || || 58–45 || L1
|- style="background:#ffbbbb;"
| 108 || August 6 || Expos || 3–5 || || || || 60–48 || L1
|- style="background:#ccffcc;"
| 109 || August 7 || Expos || 9–5 || || || || 61–48 || W1
|- style="background:#ffbbbb;"
| 110 || August 8 || Expos || 1–2 || || || || 61–49 || L1
|- style="background:#ffbbbb;"
| 121 || August 20 || Giants || 7–8 || || || || 69–52 || L2
|- style="background:#ccffcc;"
| 122 || August 21 || Giants || 7–6 || || || || 70–52 || W1
|- style="background:#ccffcc;"
| 123 || August 22 || Giants || 5–4  || || || || 71–52 || W2
|- style="background:#ccffcc;"
| 124 || August 23 || Dodgers || 11–3 || || || || 72–52 || W3
|- style="background:#ffbbbb;"
| 125 || August 24 || Dodgers || 2–5 || || || || 72–53 || L1
|- style="background:#ffbbbb;"
| 126 || August 25 || Dodgers || 3–11 || || || || 72–54 || L2
|- style="background:#ccffcc;"
| 130 || August 30 || @ Dodgers || 3–2 || || || || 75–55 || W1
|- style="background:#ffbbbb;"
| 131 || August 31 || @ Dodgers || 1–4 || || || || 75–56 || L1
|-

|- style="background:#ccffcc;"
| 132 || September 1 || @ Dodgers || 6–5  || || || || 76–56 || W1
|- style="background:#ffbbbb;"
| 133 || September 3 || @ Giants || 2–3  || || || || 76–57 || L1
|- style="background:#ffbbbb;"
| 134 || September 4 || @ Giants || 4–5 || || || || 76–58 || L2
|- style="background:#ffbbbb;"
| 135 || September 5 || @ Giants || 1–5 || || || || 76–59 || L3
|- style="background:#ccffcc;"
| 136 || September 6 || Expos || 1–0 || || || || 77–59 || W1
|- style="background:#ffbbbb;"
| 137 || September 7 || Expos || 4–7 || || || || 77–60 || L1
|- style="background:#ccffcc;"
| 138 || September 8 || Expos || 1–0 || || || || 78–60 || W1
|- style="background:#ffbbbb;"
| 142 || September 13 || @ Phillies || 0–2 || || || || 79–63 || L2
|- style="background:#ccffcc;"
| 143 || September 14 || @ Phillies || 2–0 || || || || 80–63 || W1
|- style="background:#ccffcc;"
| 144 || September 15 || @ Phillies || 8–0 || || || || 81–63 || W2
|- style="background:#ccffcc;"
| 150 || September 20 || Phillies || 4–1 || || || || 87–63 || W8
|- style="background:#ffbbbb;"
| 151 || September 21 || Phillies || 2–5 || || || || 87–64 || L1
|- style="background:#ccffcc;"
| 157 || September 27 || @ Expos || 4–2 || || || || 91–66 || W1
|- style="background:#ffbbbb;"
| 158 || September 28 || @ Expos || 4–5  || || || || 91–67 || L1
|-

|-

|- style="text-align:center;"
| Legend:       = Win       = Loss       = PostponementBold = Cardinals team member

Player stats

Batting

Starters by position 
Note: Pos = Position; G = Games played; AB = At bats; H = Hits; Avg. = Batting average; HR = Home runs; RBI = Runs batted in

Other batters 
Note: G = Games played; AB = At bats; H = Hits; Avg. = Batting average; HR = Home runs; RBI = Runs batted in

Pitching

Starting pitchers 
Note: G = Games pitched; IP = Innings pitched; W = Wins; L = Losses; ERA = Earned run average; SO = Strikeouts

Other pitchers 
Note: G = Games pitched; IP = Innings pitched; W = Wins; L = Losses; ERA = Earned run average; SO = Strikeouts

Relief pitchers 
Note: G = Games pitched; W = Wins; L = Losses; SV = Saves; ERA = Earned run average; SO = Strikeouts

Postseason

Game log 

|- style="background:#bbbbbb;"
| – || October 6 || Braves || colspan="5" | Postponed (rain) (Makeup date: October 7) 
|- style="background:#ccffcc;"
| 1 || October 7 || Braves || 7–0 || Forsch (1–0) || Pérez (0–1) || – || 1–0
|- style="background:#bbbbbb;"
| – || October 8 || Braves || colspan="5" | Postponed (rain) (Makeup date: October 9)
|- style="background:#ccffcc;"
| 2 || October 9 || Braves || 4–3 || Sutter (1–0) || Garber (0–1) || – || 2–0
|- style="background:#ccffcc;"
| 3 || October 10 || @ Braves || 6–2 || Andújar (1–0) || Camp (0–1) || Sutter (1) || 3–0
|-

|- style="background:#ffbbbb;"
| 1 || October 12 || Brewers || 0–10 || Caldwell (1–0) || Forsch (0–1) || – || 0–1
|- style="background:#ccffcc;"
| 2 || October 13 || Brewers || 5–4 || Sutter (1–0) || McClure (0–1) || – || 1–1
|- style="background:#ccffcc;"
| 3 || October 15 || @ Brewers || 6–2 || Andújar (1–0) || Vuckovich (0–1) || Sutter (1) || 2–1
|- style="background:#ffbbbb;"
| 4 || October 16 || @ Brewers || 5–7 || Slaton (1–0) || Bair (0–1) || McClure (1) || 2–2
|- style="background:#ffbbbb;"
| 5 || October 17 || @ Brewers || 4–6 || Caldwell (2–0) || Forsch (0–2) || McClure (2) || 2–3
|- style="background:#ccffcc;"
| 6 || October 19 || Brewers || 13–1 || Stuper (1–0) || Sutton (0–1) || – || 3–3
|- style="background:#ccffcc;"
| 7 || October 20 || Brewers || 6–3 || Andújar (2–0) || McClure (0–2) || Sutter (2) || 4–3
|-

NLCS

Game 1 
October 7, Busch Stadium

Game 2 
October 9, Busch Stadium

Game 3 
October 10, Atlanta–Fulton County Stadium

World Series 

In Game 3, rookie outfielder Willie McGee hit two home runs, tying a World Series record for rookies.

NL St. Louis Cardinals (4) vs. AL Milwaukee Brewers (3)

Awards and honors 
 Darrell Porter, NLCS and World Series Most Valuable Player
 Bruce Sutter, Babe Ruth Award

Farm system

References

External links
1982 St. Louis Cardinals at Baseball Reference
1982 St. Louis Cardinals at Baseball Almanac

St. Louis Cardinals seasons
St. Louis Cardinals season
National League East champion seasons
National League champion seasons
World Series champion seasons
St Louis